Sextus Cocceius Vibianus was a Roman Senator in 204. He was the son of Sextus Cocceius Severianus and Caesonia. He was also the grandson of Sextus Cocceius Severianus, Proconsul of Africa.

He married and had a daughter, who married Quintus Anicius Faustus Paulinus (born c. 180), Legate of Moesia Inferior between 229 and 230 or c. 230 to 232, and had issue.

Sources
 Christian Settipani, Les Ancêtres de Charlemagne (France: Éditions Christian, 1989).
 Christian Settipani, Continuite Gentilice et Continuite Familiale Dans Les Familles Senatoriales Romaines, A L'Epoque Imperiale, Mythe et Realite. Linacre, UK: Prosopographica et Genealogica, 2000. ILL. NYPL ASY (Rome) 03-983.
 Anthony Wagner, Pedigree and Progress, Essays in the Genealogical Interpretation of History, London, Philmore, 1975. Rutgers Alex CS4.W33.

See also
 Cocceia gens

3rd-century Romans
Senators of the Roman Empire
Year of birth unknown
Year of death unknown
Vibianus, Sextus